Matthew P. Hussey (born May 28, 1979) is an American former professional ice hockey center who played in the National Hockey League (NHL) with the Pittsburgh Penguins and Detroit Red Wings. He later played professional ice hockey in Europe in Finland, Germany, Slovakia and France.

Playing career
Hussey was born in New Haven, Connecticut and raised in Plymouth, Minnesota. He was drafted in the ninth round, 254th overall, by the Pittsburgh Penguins in the 1998 NHL Entry Draft.

Drafted from the high school hockey team, Avon Old Farms, Hussey was recruited to play collegiate hockey with the University of Wisconsin in the WCHA. After his senior year, Hussey scored 84 points in 154 games with the Badgers. On September 27, 2002, he was signed to an entry-level contract with the Penguins.

Hussey made his professional debut with the Penguins AHL affiliate, Wilkes-Barre/Scranton in the 2002–03 season. He spent the next four seasons primarily in the AHL, playing only 16 games with Pittsburgh. In the 2005–06 season he led the baby pens in scoring with 51 points.

On July 13, 2006, Hussey signed as a free agent with the Detroit Red Wings to a one-year contract. He played in five games with the Wings in 2006–07 but similarly played most of the year in the AHL with affiliate, the Grand Rapids Griffins.

On July 13, 2007, Hussey then signed a one-year contract with the Colorado Avalanche. He failed to make the Avalanche and was assigned to AHL affiliate, the Lake Erie Monsters for their inaugural 2007–08 season. In his first game with the Lake Erie, Hussey was credited with scoring the Monsters' first goal in franchise history in a 3-2 loss to the Griffins on October 6, 2007. Midway into the season, Hussey left the Monsters and signed with Finnish team Jokerit on January 30, 2008.

Hussey signed with the German team Straubing Tigers of the DEL, for 2008–09 before transferring to ERC Ingolstadt on March 9, 2009. In his third year with the team, he was named European Hockey Player of the Month for January 2012 by Eurohockey.com. He scored five goals and nine assists in nine games.

After remaining a free agent midway into the 2013–14 season, Hussey agreed to play for the remainder of the season with his third DEL club, the Thomas Sabo Ice Tigers, on December 11, 2013.

Hussey returned from Europe at the conclusion of the season with the Ice Tigers and took a year's hiatus from professional hockey. On October 13, 2015, he returned to professional hockey after he signed a contract in the ECHL with the Evansville IceMen to begin the 2015–16 season. He later returned to Europe and after a stint in Slovakia, he finished his professional career in France with Dragons de Rouen in the Ligue Magnus in the 2016–17 season.

Career statistics

References

External links

1979 births
Living people
American men's ice hockey centers
Detroit Red Wings players
Dragons de Rouen players
ERC Ingolstadt players
Evansville IceMen players
HC 07 Detva players
Grand Rapids Griffins players
Ice hockey people from New Haven, Connecticut
Ice hockey players from Minnesota
Jokerit players
Lake Erie Monsters players
People from Plymouth, Minnesota
Pittsburgh Penguins draft picks
Pittsburgh Penguins players
Straubing Tigers players
Thomas Sabo Ice Tigers players
Wilkes-Barre/Scranton Penguins players
Wisconsin Badgers men's ice hockey players
Avon Old Farms alumni
American expatriate ice hockey players in Finland
American expatriate ice hockey players in Germany
American expatriate ice hockey players in Slovakia
American expatriate ice hockey players in France